The spotted woodcreeper (Xiphorhynchus erythropygius) is a species of bird in the Dendrocolaptinae subfamily. It is found in Belize, Colombia, Costa Rica, Ecuador, El Salvador, Guatemala, Honduras, Mexico, Nicaragua, and Panama.

The head is spotted, turning into short streaks on the back. The breast is also spotted with oblong buffy spots. This species also has a distinct buffy eyering.

Its natural habitats are subtropical or tropical moist lowland forests and subtropical or tropical moist montane forests. It is found at all levels of the canopy, and is often part of mixed-species foraging flocks.

It is not considered a threatened species by the IUCN.

References

External links

 
 
 
 
 
 
 

spotted woodcreeper
Birds of Central America
Birds of the Tumbes-Chocó-Magdalena
spotted woodcreeper
spotted woodcreeper
Taxonomy articles created by Polbot